Boroujen (also Romanized as Borojen, Borūjen, Boroojen, Broojen; also known as Urjen, or Oorjen) is a city in the Central District of Borujen County, Chaharmahal and Bakhtiari province, Iran, and serves as capital of the county. At the 2006 census, its population was 49,077 in 12,828 households. The following census in 2011 counted 52,694 people in 14,858 households. The latest census in 2016 showed a population of 57,071 people in 17,228 households.

The city is populated by Persians with a minority of Lurs and Turkic peoples.

Weather and climate

Borujen is well known for its extremely cold weather, usually mentioned as one of the coldest Iranian cities in national weather forecasts. It is located on an altitude of about 2197 m above sea levels. Its climate is usually a combination of moderate summers and very cold winters. Snow days are normally 122 days per year, and the temperature could reach -27 °C. The maximum observed temperature has been 36 °C. Average annular precipitation is 243 mm (24% in the spring, 1% in the summer, 33% in the fall, and 44% in the winter).

Borujen has one of the highest elevation of Iran's cities, making it rich and fruitful in terms of flora and fauna. The city is located in a valley with the same name, which has a total area of 580 m² in the eastern part of Chaharmahal and Bakhtiari province.

Gallery

Higher education

Borujen hosts  several higher education institutes:
 Payam-e-Noor University of Boroujen 
 Islamic Azad University of Boroujen 
 Nursing Faculty of Boroujen 
 Boroujen Technical School

References

External links
Municipal Borujen
Governor Borujen
Borujen News Agency
https://web.archive.org/web/20110712025929/http://broujencity.ir

Borujen County

Cities in Chaharmahal and Bakhtiari Province

Populated places in Chaharmahal and Bakhtiari Province

Populated places in Borujen County